Pío Ballesteros (1 April 1919 - 1995) was a Spanish writer, producer and director. He only directed three films: Consultaré a Mister Brown (1946), Facultad de Letras (1949) and El alma de la copla (1965). José Luis López Vázquez worked with Ballesteros and Enrique Herreros as assistant director.

Filmography

As director
 Viaje a Sudáfrica (1969)
 El alma de la copla (1965)
 Facultad de letras (1952)
 Consultaré a Mister Brown (1946)

As producer
 Rififí en la ciudad (1963)

As writer
 Málaga, vino y sol (1974)
 Entrega de la bandera a la policía armada (1970)
 Guadalajara, tierra de lagos (1970)
 Viaje a Sudáfrica (1969)
 Coronación imperial (1968)
 Feria del Campo 1968 (1968)
 Modas 69 (1968)
 Sitges (1968)
 Vamos a La Rioja (1968)
 El signo de la Navidad (1967)
 Cerrado por asesinato (1964)
 La mano de un hombre muerto (1962)
 Vampiresas 1930 (1962)
 Una isla con tomate (1962)
 Don Lucio y el hermano Pío (1960)
 Y después del cuplé (1959)
 Aventuras de Esparadrapo (1949)
 Consultaré a Mister Brown (1946)
 Misión blanca (1946)

References

External links
 

1919 births
1995 deaths
Spanish male screenwriters
Film producers from Madrid
Film directors from Madrid
Spanish documentary film directors
20th-century Spanish screenwriters
20th-century Spanish male writers